Mammea usambarensis is a species of flowering plant in the Calophyllaceae family. It is found only in Tanzania.

References

usambarensis
Endemic flora of Tanzania
Vulnerable plants
Taxonomy articles created by Polbot
Plants described in 1976